Universidad La Salle also referred to by its acronym ULSA is a private Catholic secondary and higher education institution run by the Institute of the Brothers of the Christian Schools in 15 campuses in Mexico. It offers high school, bachelor, master and Ph.D degrees. It has had an expansion in the country, creating its own university national system. Its main campus is located in Mexico City, and has a presence in Ciudad Obregón, Chihuahua, Gomez Palacio, Monterrey, Ciudad Victoria,  Leon, Morelia, Pachuca, Ciudad Nezahualcóyotl, Puebla, Oaxaca, Cancun, Cuernavaca and Saltillo.

It is part of the educational community of the Brothers of the Christian Schools, founded by Saint Jean-Baptiste de La Salle, patron saint of education. The congregation has about seventy-seven thousand lay partners and one million students around the world, with establishments of higher learning in Argentina, Belgium, Brazil, Colombia, France, Guatemala, Israel, Ivory Coast, Jerusalem, Pakistan, Palestine, Philippines, Spain, the United States, and Venezuela.

History
In 1905, the brothers of La Salle Jerbert Alphonse Gibert, Adrien Marie Astruc, Amedée Francois Vincent and Antoinde Claude Carrel traveled to Mexico from Le Havre, France, along with Br. Pedro Celestino Schniedier who traveled from Colombia. They founded the delegation of LaSalle brethren in Mexico. The brothers established schools in Puebla, Toluca, Torreon, Monterrey, and various other locations in the country. Their first high school in Mexico City opened in 1931, the Colegio Francés De la Salle. In 1932 the school won formal recognition and authorization by the National Autonomous University of Mexico. In 1938 the Colegio Cristóbal Colón was also established in the Colonia San Rafael.

The history of Universidad La Salle began with the relocation of Colegio Cristóbal Colón to the center of the traditional Colonia Condesa in Mexico City in 1962. On February 15 it opened its doors with only the high school building completed and a partially built tower, gym and auditorium. By May of the same year, it had rapidly grown to announce its transformation from just a school to a full university category. Since then, it has undergone continuous expansion. The main campus has a population of approximately 10,000 students, and has expanded its campus throughout Mexico City with buildings in many areas of the city.

There are branches of Universidad La Salle in 15 Mexican states. The La Salle educational institution itself is represented in over 82 different countries, and 5 continents making it the largest educational community in the world.

ULSA is among the top 7 private universities in Mexico and ranked in the top three in areas such as Architecture, Mechanical Engineering, Industrial Engineering, Chemical Engineering and Medicine.

The Universidad La Salle medical school (Facultad Mexicana de Medicina) is one of the most prestigious medical school in Mexico. It was Mexico's first private medical school and was founded in 1970. It is accredited by the Consejo Mexicano para la Acreditación de la Educación Médica (COMAEM), and is listed in the International Medical Education Directory. Albeit a young school, many of the country's department heads are graduates from La Salle.

University presidents
2021 - Present Hno. José Francisco Flores Gamio F.S.C.
2011– 2021 Dr. Enrique Gonzalez Alvarez
2009–2011 M.A. Martín Rocha Pedrajo
2006–2009 Dr. Ambrosio Luna Salas
2000–2006 Mtro. Raúl Valadez García
1991–2000 Dr. Lucio Tazzer de Schrijver
1988–1991 Dr. José Cervantes Hernández
1983–1988 M.A. César Rangel Barrera
1974–1983 Dr. Francisco L. Cervantes Lechuga
1968–1974 Dr. Guillermo Alba López
1962–1968 Dr. Manuel de J. Álvarez Campos

Campuses

Cancún
Chihuahua
Ciudad Obregón
Ciudad Nezahualcóyotl
Ciudad Victoria
Cuernavaca
Guadalajara
Laguna
León
Mexico City
Monterrey
Morelia
Pachuca
Puebla
Saltillo
Oaxaca

Programs

Architecture
Accounting
Biomedical Engineering
Business Administration
Chemical engineering
Chemistry of Food
Civil engineering
Communications
Cybernetics and computer science engineering
Education
Electrical and electronic systems engineering
Graphic design
Industrial engineering
International Relations
International business trade
Law
Marketing
Management information systems
Mechanical and Energy systems engineering
Mechatronics Engineering
Medicine
Pharmaceutical biochemistry
Philosophy
Religious studies
University-preparatory school

Degrees

Specialties

Graduate programs

Business School
 Administration
 International Business Administration
 Health Organizations Administration
 Economic and Financial Engineering
 Strategic Management of Human Capital
 Information Technologies in the Business Direction

Chemical Sciences School
 Food Science and Human Nutrition
 Clinical Pharmacology
 Quality and Applied Statistics

Law School
 Business law
 Civil law
 Criminal law

Engineering School
 Master of Science, Field of Cybertronics
 Project Management and Building Business

Social Sciences and Humanities School
 Social Philosophy
 Master of Education, Field of Education Management
 Master of Education, Field of Educational Intervention

Mexican Architecture, Design and Communication School
 Management of Real Estate Projects

Graduate school and research direction
 MIEX Master International Management
 MIEX General Information for 2nd academic year

Doctorates
Administration
Education

Ph.D.
Education
Law

Courses of distant learning
Courses of Quality in the Service
Assertive communication
Discipline with dignity
Design of Strategies for the Evaluation for Competitions
Strategies of Motivation at the Classroom
Developmental strategies of the Competition Lectora in the Pupil of half level and half a superior
Evaluation of the Quality of the Services
Effective negotiation
New form of Learning News
Planning for Competitions
Preparation for Residencias's National Exam Medical ( ENARM )

Courses of continuous education
Orthographic Bringing Up To Date and Modern Wording
Juridical argumentation
Emotional intelligence
Finance stops Nonfinancial
Selling Techniques

See also
Institute of the Brothers of the Christian Schools

References

Bibliography 
 Concepción Barrón Tirado. Universidades privadas: formación en educación, Mexico, ed.National Autonomous university of Mexico, Plaza and Valdés, 
LEVY, Daniel C. ( 1995 ) higher education and the status in Latin America: Private challenges to the public predominance Collection Problemas educational of Mexico, Mexico, ed.Latin American faculty of Social Sciences, Estudios's Centro on the University, UNAM, Miguel angel Porrúa, 
ULSA ( 1979 ) Catálogo Universidad The Salle A.C. 79-80 Mexico, ed.The University's Apartment of Information and Promotion Her, Leave To Him

External links
 Official site
 La Salle at the Institute of International Education.

Lasallian colleges and universities
Universidad La Salle México
Educational institutions established in 1962